Xylophilus is a species of bacteria, which causes plant disease. It is available from the NCPPB in the United Kingdom for legitimate researchers and plant disease diagnosticians working in premises licensed to hold it.

The genus Xylophilus currently comprises only the species X. ampelinus, which affects grapevines.

References 

Xanthomonadales
Bacterial grape diseases
Monotypic bacteria genera